Voay is an extinct genus of crocodile from Madagascar that lived during the Late Pleistocene to Holocene, containing only one species, V. robustus. Numerous subfossils have been found, including complete skulls, noted for their distinctive pair of horns on the posterior, as well as vertebrae and osteoderms from such places as Ambolisatra and Antsirabe. The genus is thought to have become extinct relatively recently. It has been suggested to have disappeared in the extinction event that wiped out much of the endemic megafauna on Madagascar, such as the elephant bird and Malagasy hippo, following the arrival of humans to Madagascar around 2000 years ago. Its name comes from the Malagasy word for crocodile.

Description
One unusual feature of V. robustus that distinguishes it from other crocodilians is the presence of prominent "horns" extending from the posterior portion of the skull. They are actually the posterolaterally extended corners of the squamosal bone. Other related crocodilians such as Aldabrachampsus also had similar bony projections, although in Aldabrachampsus these projections were more like crests than horns. Another diagnostic characteristic is the near-exclusion of the nasals from the external naris. It had a shorter and deeper snout than the extant Crocodylus niloticus, as well as relatively robust limbs. The osteoderms had tall keels and were dorsally symmetrical with curved lateral margins, running the entire length of the postcranial body.

V. robustus has been estimated to have obtained lengths up to 5 m (16.4 ft) and a weight of 170 kg (375 lbs). These estimates suggest that V. robustus was the largest predator to have existed in Madagascar in recent times. Its size, stature, and presumed behavior is similar to the modern Nile crocodile (Crocodylus niloticus). Because V. robustus shared so many similarities with the Nile crocodile there must have been a great deal of interspecific competition for resources between the two crocodile genera if they were to have coexisted with one another. It has recently been proposed that the Nile crocodile only migrated to the island from mainland Africa after V. robustus had become extinct in Madagascar. However, this was subsequently disproved after some Crocodylus specimens from Madagascar were found to be over 7,000 years old and contemporaneous with Voay.

Phylogenetics
When V. robustus was first described in 1872, it was originally assigned to the genus Crocodylus. It was later found to morphologically have had more in common with the extant Osteolaemus, or dwarf crocodile, than Crocodylus. Some features it shared with Osteolaemus include a depressed pterygoid surface that forms a choanal "neck" on the palate. Because it was not close enough to be placed in the same genus as the dwarf crocodile, it was assigned to the new genus in 2007. Before this reassignment, the species was considered by some to be synonymous with Crocodylus niloticus. However, this was most likely due to a misinterpretation of remains from the living C. niloticus with V. robustus and the poor description of the original material from which the species was described. In contrast to the morphological similarities with Osteolaemus, a 2021 study using paleogenomics found Voay to be a sister group to Crocodylus, with both genera diverging in the mid-late Oligocene; this indicates that the apparent similarities with Osteolaemus are likely due to convergent evolution.

The below cladogram shows the results of the latest study:

References

Pleistocene crocodylomorphs
Pleistocene reptiles of Africa
Crocodylidae
Holocene extinctions
Endemic fauna of Madagascar
Crocodylomorphs of Madagascar
Prehistoric pseudosuchian genera
Fossil taxa described in 2007
Crocodilians of Africa
Pleistocene genus first appearances